Víctor Iván Macías García (born July 1, 1984) is an Ecuadorian footballer who most recently played for Clan Juvenil in the Ecuadorian Serie A.

External links
Víctor Macías at BDFA.com.ar 

1984 births
Living people
People from Portoviejo
Association football forwards
Ecuadorian footballers
L.D.U. Quito footballers
L.D.U. Loja footballers
L.D.U. Portoviejo footballers
S.D. Aucas footballers
S.D. Quito footballers
C.D. ESPOLI footballers
Mushuc Runa S.C. footballers
C.D. Olmedo footballers
C.D. Clan Juvenil footballers